Paul's Bridge is a stone bridge carrying the Neponset Valley Parkway over the Neponset River between Milton and southern Boston, Massachusetts. It was built in 1849 by Thomas Hollis, Jr., of Milton, but was later reconstructed using the original materials. It replaced the earlier Hubbard's Bridge (built prior to 1759), and a subsequent Paul's Bridge (so named at its 1807 reconstruction). The name "Paul" can be attributed to Samuel Paul, the owner of the adjacent land on the Readville (now Boston) side, which was part of Dedham at the time of the bridge's construction.

Each round arch measures  at the springline. The area between the arches is uncoursed rubblestone, and the arches are formed out of cut granite voussoirs. The bridge underwent a major rebuilding between 1932-1935 under the leadership of Arthur A. Shurcliff, FASLA and founder of the AIP, who made it a priority to widen the bridge. Most of the original stone was reused and solid stone parapets replaced the wooden siderails. Instead of a rubblestone finish between the arches on the extended side, it is finished in coursed stone.

Paul's Bridge was added to the National Register of Historic Places in 1972, and contributes to a historic district encompassing the Neponset River Parkway.  It is located within the Neponset River Reservation, and is maintained by the Massachusetts Department of Conservation and Recreation.

See also
National Register of Historic Places listings in Milton, Massachusetts
National Register of Historic Places listings in southern Boston, Massachusetts
List of bridges on the National Register of Historic Places in Massachusetts

References

Bridges completed in 1849
Road bridges on the National Register of Historic Places in Massachusetts
Bridges in Boston
Bridges over the Neponset River
Bridges in Norfolk County, Massachusetts
Milton, Massachusetts
National Register of Historic Places in Milton, Massachusetts
National Register of Historic Places in Boston
Historic district contributing properties in Massachusetts
1849 establishments in Massachusetts
Stone arch bridges in the United States